Held for Damages is a 1916 American short silent comedy film, directed by Jack Harvey. It stars A.H. Busby, Harry Benham, and Edna Pendleton.

References

External links

1916 films
American silent short films
Silent American comedy films
1916 comedy films
Films directed by Jack Harvey
1916 short films
American black-and-white films
American comedy short films
1910s American films